Mattithiah is a given name. Notable people with the name include:

 Mattithiah Ahrweiler ( 1650–1728), German rabbi
 Matteya ben Heresh (Mattithiah ben Heresh), 2nd-century Roman tanna
 Mattithiah ben Solomon Delacrut, Mordecai Yoffe's teacher in Cabala

See also
 Matthew (name)